Cristian Daniel Neguț (born 9 December 1995) is a Romanian professional footballer who plays as a forward for Liga I club Chindia Târgoviște, which he captains.

Career
Neguț started his senior career with Urban Titu in the third league. In 2016 he joined Chindia Târgoviște, which he aided in promoting to the Liga I at the end of the 2018–19 season by scoring twelve times from 34 appearances.

On 15 July 2019, Neguț made his top flight debut in a 2–2 draw at Gaz Metan Mediaș, and on 16 August netted for the first time in the competition in a 3–2 home defeat of Dinamo București.

On 18 January 2022, Neguț agreed to a loan at reigning champions CFR Cluj until the end of the campaign. He recorded his debut five days later, in a 3–3 league draw at FCSB, and scored his first goal on 12 February in a 2–1 victory over Gaz Metan Mediaș.

Career statistics

Club

Honours
Chindia Târgoviște
Liga II: 2018–19

CFR Cluj
Liga I: 2021–22

References

External links

Cristian Neguț at Liga Profesionistă de Fotbal 

1995 births
Living people
Sportspeople from Ploiești
Romanian footballers
Association football forwards
Liga I players
Liga II players
Liga III players
AFC Chindia Târgoviște players
CFR Cluj players